Albert Washburn may refer to:
 Albert Benjamin Washburn (1869–1942), American politician from Iowa
 Albert Henry Washburn (1866–1930), American lawyer and diplomat
 Albert Lincoln Washburn (1911–2007), American geomorphologist